Nadia Lutfi or Nadia Loutfi (born Poula Mohamed Mostafa Shafiq; 3 January 1937 – 4 February 2020) was an Egyptian actress. During the apex of her career, she was one of the most popular actresses of Egyptian cinema's golden age.

Early life
Nadia was born in Cairo as Poula Mohamed Mostafa Shafiq to an Egyptian father, Mohamed Mostafa, and an Upper Egyptian Muslim mother named Fatma. Family of  Nadia Lutfi was Muslim.

Career
Nadia began acting as a hobby; when she was 10 years old she participated in a play at her school and did very well. When the 24-year-old was about to make her screen debut in 1958, Omar Sharif was the reigning king of Egyptian cinema, and his wife, Egyptian superstar Faten Hamama, its queen. The star couple had just had a smash hit with the film La Anam with Hamama as "Nadia Lotfy", a willful teen who destroys her father's marriage. Poula adopted the forename and a variation of the surname of the character as her own.

Under her newly changed name, the young actress was spotted by director Ramses Naguib. Her first film role was in a modest, black & white drama, Soultan in 1958. Her second picture was a smaller role in one of the film landmarks of its time, Cairo Station. In 1963, she played a Frankish woman warrior of the Crusade era, donning full armor to go into battle against Issa Al-Awam her Christian-Arab lover, (role was played by Salah Zulfikar), in Naser Salah el Dine (occasionally shown on television in the United States as Saladin and the Great Crusades) (1963). In Lil-Rigal Faqat  aka For Men Only (1964) of Mahmoud Zulfikar, Lutfi and co-star Soad Hosny played women geologists who, denied employment, respond by disguising themselves as men and going to work, where they find they must suppress their romantic instincts to sustain the disguise.

In the mid-1960s, she starred in two films that were based on stories by Nobel-winning author Naguib Mahfouz, just a few years following the publication of his widely banned  novel  Awlad Haretna  اولاد حارتنا which symbolize God and  Moses, Jesus and Mohammed, Children of Gebelawi. Lutfi finished the decade starring in Abi Foq Al-Shagara aka My father Over The Tree (1969) as a nightclub dancer who beds a much younger man, then discovers that she once knew his father equally well. As well as El Momia aka The Night of Counting the Years (1969). She starred in several films with Soad Hosny, including Al-Saba' Banat aka The Seven Girls.

In the 1970s, her career wound down as Egypt's "Golden Age" for films drew to a close. Her most prominent films includes Regal Bila Malameh aka Featureless Men (1972), where she played a role of a night girl, the film was a commercial hit. She also starred in El-Okhwa El-A'daa aka Enemy Brothers (1974), and Badiaa Masabni aka Badi’a Masabny (1975) of Hassan El Imam. Having made close to 50 films in the first 11 years of her career, she only made three in the decade that followed, and did not work in films since 1981.

In 2014, the Cairo International Film Festival paid tribute to Nadia Lutfi by using her photo on the Festival's official poster for it’s 36th edition.

Death
On 4 February 2020, after being in intensive care for some time, Nadia Lutfi died in Maadi Hospital, Cairo.

Selected filmography

Footnotes

External links
 Cairo Station film review 
 Profile

1937 births
2020 deaths
Egyptian film actresses
Egyptian television actresses
Egyptian stage actresses
Egyptian Muslims
Actresses from Cairo